Bohaiornithidae is a group of early predatory enantiornitheans from the early Cretaceous Period of China. All known specimens come from the Jiufotang Formation and Yixian Formation, dating to the early Aptian age, 125–120 million years ago. Bohaiornithidae was first coined as a family of enantiornithean birds by Wang and colleagues in 2014. They defined it as the natural group formed by all descendants of the common ancestor of the type species, Bohaiornis guoi, and Shenqiornis mengi.

Description
Similar to most enantiornitheans, bohaiornithids possessed teeth rather than a beak as in modern birds, although they could be distinguished from other enantiornitheans due to the structure of their teeth. Their teeth were large, robust and somewhat conical, but had sharply pointed tips which curved backwards. The first few teeth of the premaxillae are smaller than the rest of the teeth, but the other teeth in the front of the mouth were larger than those in the back.

Bohaiornithids also had lateral trabeculae (a pair of long and thin bony projections on the rear edge of the sternum) which not only extended backwards, but also outwards. The tips of each branch of the furcula (wishbone) are wide and rounded in bohaiornithids, as opposed to the tapering tips in other enantiornitheans. Their scapulae (shoulder blades) slightly curve downwards, created a convex top edge and concave lower edge. Bohaiornithids also had gradually tapering pygostyles. A bohaiornithid's second (innermost) toes were thicker than their other toes, while their third (middle) toes were long and thin and all of their toe claws were very long and curved.

Most adult bohaiornithids would have been rather similar in size and appearance to each other, and the family lacked the longevity and physical diversity of some other enantiornithean groups, such as the long-snouted longipterygids. The only specimens of bohaiornithids believed to have reached adulthood (the holotype of Zhouornis and a referred specimen of Bohaiornis) were also the largest specimens, and were about the size of a pigeon, which is much larger than most other Jehol enantiornitheans with the exception of Pengornis and Xiangornis. The smallest and youngest bohaiornithid specimens were about half the size of the largest ones.

Many bohaiornithids have been found preserving feathers, and a few possessed a pair of long, ribbon-like tail feathers with barbs only at the tips. These specialized feathers are known in many enantiornithean specimens (as well as Confuciusornis), and may be an example of sexual dimorphism, with the feathers being used by male members of a species for courtship display. A subadult specimen of an indeterminate bohaiornithid described in 2017 preserved feathers on various parts of the head and body which were analyzed and determined to have been iridescent in life.

Paleoecology
A referred adult specimen of Bohaiornis was preserved with several rocks concentrated in the stomach region. Rocks in the stomach of birds and other animals are often believed to be gastroliths swallowed to assist in the digestion of plant material. However, the rocks apparently swallowed by this specimen are much larger, coarser, and less numerous than most gastroliths, and were unlikely to have been used for the same purpose as those swallowed by herbivores. Instead, it has been suggested that they were swallowed to help clean the digestive tract, a usage which has been reported in living birds of prey as well as other carnivorous animals with high-fat diets, such as pinnipeds. The description of this specimen claimed that it was plausible, but uncertain, that Bohaiornis was ecologically similar to birds of prey.

However, these rocks were later found to be mineral concretions, probably formed from the same mineral as the fossil specimen. Thus, they are not indicative of diet.

Bohaiornithids had foot proportions which were between those expected of arboreal and terrestrial birds, but their long claws make terrestrial habits unlikely. Nevertheless, bohaiornithids lacked many of the specialized foot features which allow modern birds to perch and climb tree trunks. Although long claws are known in modern birds of prey, bohaiornithids had short tarsometatarsals (ankle bones) which were dissimilar to most raptors with the exception of members of the subfamily Perninae.

Among birds of prey, bohaiornithids had leg proportions most similar to ospreys, and thus it is conceivable that they were piscivorous. However, their teeth suggest a diet of hard-shelled creatures.

Classification
The cladogram below was found in the phylogenetic analysis of Wang et al. 2014, which itself was an updated version of O’Connor et al. 2013. The cladogram is based on a data matrix that includes 56 avialan taxa, scored based on 262 morphological traits.

The Wang et al. phylogenetic analysis was reused during the description of Linyiornis in 2016. This study it indicated that previously known bohaiornithid taxa formed a polytomy with Linyiornis and Fortunguavis, supporting the possibility that those two genera are also examples of the family, although Fortunguavis is notoriously difficult to place phylogenetically.

References

Enantiornitheans
Prehistoric dinosaur families
Early Cretaceous birds of Asia
Early Cretaceous first appearances
Early Cretaceous extinctions